Trevor Bedford was a former professional rugby league footballer who played in the 1960s and 1970s, who played at club level for Dewsbury and Castleford.

Playing career

Castleford
Bedford played in Castleford's victory in the Yorkshire County League during the 1964–65 season.

Representative career
On 3 April 1965, Bedford played in the first ever Great Britain under-24 international match in a 17–9 win against France under-24's.

References

External links

Search For "Trevor" at rugbyleagueproject.org
Trevor Bedford Memory Box Search at archive.castigersheritage.com
Search for "Trevor Bedford" at britishnewspaperarchive.co.uk

20th-century births
2015 deaths
Castleford Tigers players
Dewsbury Rams players
Huddersfield Giants players
English rugby league players
Place of birth missing
Year of birth missing